Nye noveller (lit. New Short Stories) is a 1967 short story collection by Norwegian author Johan Borgen. It won the Nordic Council's Literature Prize in 1967.

References

1967 short story collections
Norwegian short story collections
Nordic Council's Literature Prize-winning works